NGC 208 is a spiral galaxy located approximately 229 million light-years from the Solar System in the constellation Pisces. It was discovered on October 5, 1863 by Albert Marth.

See also 
 Spiral galaxy 
 List of NGC objects (1–1000)
 Pisces (constellation)

References

External links 
 
 
 SEDS

0208
Spiral galaxies
2420
Pisces (constellation)
Astronomical objects discovered in 1863